Tarzan Triumphs is a 1943 adventure film in which Tarzan fights the Nazis. Johnny Weissmuller had portrayed the Edgar Rice Burroughs character in six films with Metro-Goldwyn-Mayer, but this was his first with the producer Sol Lesser at RKO Pictures. Lesser had previously produced Tarzan the Fearless and Tarzan's Revenge. Weissmuller was reunited with two of his three co-stars from several of the earlier films, Johnny Sheffield and Cheeta, but Maureen O'Sullivan was unable to reprise her role as Jane because the franchise switched from MGM to RKO, and O'Sullivan was an MGM contract player. Instead, Frances Gifford played the princess of the lost city of Palandrya, which is conquered by Germans.

Plot
During World War II, Tarzan and his son, Boy, are living on the Great Escarpment, though Jane has returned to the United Kingdom to tend to her sick mother. Jane's letter to Tarzan and Boy describes the ongoing struggle against Nazi Germany. Searching for raw materials in Sub-Saharan Africa to help Germany's cause, a small force of Nazi paratroopers lands and takes over the lost city of "Palandrya" as an advance base and enslave its people. Lieutenant Schmidt is separated from the other paratroopers, but has a short wave radio enabling him to contact his superiors in Berlin. Schmidt convalesces at Tarzan's camp, telling Tarzan he is English. 

Zandra escapes after the Nazis kill her brother Achmet. Finding Tarzan, she discloses the Nazis' presence, and he concludes Schmidt is a Nazi. Tarzan's chimpanzee, Cheetah, with an elephant's assistance, pushes Schmidt off a cliff and he falls to his death. Zandra tries to convince Tarzan to help her people, but Tarzan ignores her, having previously said, "Jungle people fight to live, civilized people live to fight." Zandra plans to return home, but Tarzan stops her.

Several Nazis search Tarzan's camp for the radio. They ultimately kidnap Boy, and they presume Tarzan is dead after shooting him out of a tree. Uninjured and hidden from the Nazis by Cheetah's monkey brigade, an angry Tarzan shouts, "Now Tarzan make war!"  Tarzan infiltrates the lost city, destroying a machine gun, and killing several Germans. He is temporarily captured, joining Zandra and Boy, but is freed by Cheetah and defeats the German invaders with his knife and an elephant blitzkrieg.

In the final scene, Cheetah speaks into the radio; the Nazis in Berlin mistake Cheetah's sounds for the rants of Adolf Hitler.

Cast
 Johnny Weissmuller as Tarzan
 Johnny Sheffield as Boy
 Frances Gifford as Zandra
 Stanley Ridges as Colonel Von Reichart
 Sig Ruman as Sergeant
 Philip Van Zandt as Captain Bausch
 Rex Williams as Lieutenant Reinhardt Schmidt
 Pedro de Cordoba as Oman, the Patriarch
 Sven Hugo Borg as Heinz
 Stanley Brown as Achmet
 George Lynn as Nazi Pilot (uncredited)
 Manuel París as Pallandria Man (uncredited)
 Otto Reichow as Grüber (uncredited)
 Wilhelm von Brincken as General Hoffman in Berlin (uncredited)
 William Yetter Sr. as Nazi Guard (uncredited)

Production

The U.S. State Department informed Sol Lesser that a Tarzan film would be an ideal way to spread the message of democracy's battle against Fascism to the American public. Lesser's first RKO Tarzan film had made the Ape Man a symbol of American isolationism. The film was the highest grossing of Lesser's Tarzan films.

Unlike in previous Tarzan films, the natives are played by whites in South Sea Island costume rather than the black Africans of the MGM films. This use of non-blacks as natives continued for several other Tarzan films in the 1940s.

Reception
The film made a profit of $208,000.

References

External links

 
 
 
 
 Tarzan Triumphs history at ERBzine.com

1943 films
1940s fantasy adventure films
American fantasy adventure films
American black-and-white films
American sequel films
American World War II propaganda films
Films about Nazis
Tarzan films
Films produced by Sol Lesser
Lost world films
Films scored by Paul Sawtell
1940s English-language films